Kentropyx calcarata, commonly known as the striped forest whiptail, is a species of lizard endemic to South America.

Behavior 
Kentropyx calcarata commonly participate in communal nesting. While no clear reasoning has been found, a recent study suggested that communally incubated eggs took up less water while also yielding larger offsprings.

Geographic range
The striped forest whiptail lives in the South American countries of Brazil, Bolivia, Venezuela and northeastern South American countries such as French Guiana and Suriname.

Parasites 
Kentropyx calcarata specimens are sometimes plagued by the parasitic protist, Plasmodium lepidoptiformis.

References

Further reading
Spix JB. 1825. Animalia nova sive species nova lacertarum, quas in itinere per Brasiliam annis MDCCCXVII – MDCCCXX jussu et auspicius Maximiliani Josephi I. Bavariae Regis. Munich: F.S. Hübschmann. iv + 26 pp. + Plates I-XXVIII. (Kentropyx calcaratus, p. 21 + Plate XXII, Figure 2).
 Uetz P, Etzold T. 1996. "The EMBL/EBI Reptile Database". Herpetological Review 27 (4): 174–175.

calcarata
Reptiles described in 1825
Taxa named by Johann Baptist von Spix